Bid Mud Lake is a lake in South Bruce Peninsula, Bruce County in southwestern Ontario, Canada.

The lake has one unnamed inflow at the east, arriving from Little Mud Lake. The primary outflow is an unnamed creek at the northwest which flows to Berford Lake, the source of the Rankin River, which in turn flows via the Sauble River to Lake Huron.

See also
List of lakes in Ontario

References

Lakes of Bruce County